Krzysztof Fikiel (born 3 February 1958) is a Polish former basketball player. He competed in the men's tournament at the 1980 Summer Olympics. At a height 6'9", he played center in his time in EuroBasket, averaging 11.3 points.

References

1958 births
Living people
Polish men's basketball players
Olympic basketball players of Poland
Basketball players at the 1980 Summer Olympics
People from Nowy Sącz County
Sportspeople from Lesser Poland Voivodeship